Brian Wardle (born October 9, 1979) is an American college basketball coach and the current men's basketball coach at Bradley University.

Biography
Born in Clarendon Hills, Illinois, Wardle played for Marquette from 1997–2001, ending his career as the third-leading scorer in school history. As a senior, he averaged 18.8 points per game. After college, Wardle played in the NBA Developmental League and the Continental Basketball Association.

He was director of basketball operations at Marquette from 2003–2005 and an assistant coach at UW-Green Bay from 2005–2010. After the 2009-2010 season, Wardle was named head coach at UW-Green Bay. Upon his hiring, Wardle became the youngest head coach in NCAA Division I basketball.  In 2014, Wardle was named the Horizon League Coach of the Year. In 2015, he left to take the coaching job at Bradley, which posted a 9-24 record the season before his arrival and a 5-27 record after the year in which he arrived. He had a 95-65 record at Green Bay but failed to make the NCAA Tournament.

On March 10, 2019, Wardle led the Braves to the NCAA Tournament by winning The Missouri Valley’s “Arch Madness” Tournament. The Braves defeated Northern Iowa 57-54. This is the first conference tournament championship for Bradley since 1988, and the first trip to the NCAA Tournament for Bradley since 2006. Bradley played two seeded Michigan State on March 21, 2019. Wardle was asked to keep wearing a red pair of shoes his wife had bought him. Wardle, claiming he wasn't superstitious, "everyone else is," wore his red shoes. Bradley was 8-0 when Wardle wore these shoes. Bradley led Michigan State at half 35-34, dominating the boards in the first half. Bradley lost the game 
76-65.

Prior to Bradley's NCAA Tournament game against Michigan State, Wardle was involved in a controversy that gained national attention. A Bradley Athletics official revoked media access to a local beat reporter due to not "promoting the Bradley brand." Wardle later apologized and the reporter's access to the team was restored.

Head coaching record

References

External links
Coaching profile

1979 births
Living people
American men's basketball coaches
American men's basketball players
Basketball coaches from Illinois
Basketball players from Illinois
Bradley Braves men's basketball coaches
College men's basketball head coaches in the United States
Fayetteville Patriots players
Green Bay Phoenix men's basketball coaches
Marquette Golden Eagles men's basketball coaches
Marquette Golden Eagles men's basketball players
People from Clarendon Hills, Illinois
Rockford Lightning players
Sportspeople from DuPage County, Illinois